Trevor Harding may refer to:

 Trevor Harding (speedway rider) (born 1986), Australian speedway rider
 Trevor Harding (politician) (born 1965), Canadian politician